Australian wheatbelts comprise inland agricultural regions across southern and eastern Australia. The regions are named for wheat, which was the main agricultural product in the early history of Australia's development - today many other crops are also produced.

Climate

The wheatbelt is relatively dry with low levels of underground water, making agriculture largely reliant on the rainfall. Rainfall varies from the coastal regions which has more dependable rain to the drier and more volatile inland regions. In the wheatbelt both land productivity and prices tend to be determined by the level of rainfall.

Regions
Wheat-growing regions in Australia are situated within the temperate zones of the country, such as areas that receive more than 300mm of rainfall annually. The isopleth of the wheatbelt corresponds to the Goyder's line in South Australia with Orroroo and Minnipa being on the boundary. In Western Australia, Southern Cross lies on the bounds, with other areas on the boundary being Mildura in Victoria, Cobar or Walgett to Deniliquin in New South Wales and St George in Queensland.

Production
In addition to wheat, the wheatbelt produces coarse grains (including barley, oats, sorghum, and maize), oilseeds (including rape seed, sunflower, soybean, safflower and linseed) and legumes (including lupins, peanuts and various peas beans and lentils).

See also
 Agriculture in Australia
 Climate of Australia
 Geography of Australia

References

Grain industry of Australia
Wheat production
Regions of Australia
Belt regions